The Monolith Festival was a music festival held at Red Rocks Amphitheatre in Morrison, Colorado.  The first festival took place September 14–15, 2007 on 5 stages, including the Red Rocks main stage.

The 2008 Monolith Festival was held on September 13–14.

On April 11, 2009, it was announced on the official Monolith Festival Facebook Page that the 2009 Monolith Festival will be held on September 12–13.

2007

Lineup

The lineup for the 2007 festival comprised over 50 bands, including (although not limited to):
 Art Brut
 Au Revoir Simone
 Bob Log III
 Black Rebel Motorcycle Club
 The Brian Jonestown Massacre
 Cake
 Clap Your Hands Say Yeah 
 Cloud Cult
 Das EFX
 The Decemberists
 Editors
 Everything Absent or Distorted
 Hot IQs
 The Flaming Lips
 Flosstradamus
 Ghostland Observatory
 Kid Sister
 Kings of Leon
 Matt & Kim
 Spoon 
 William Elliott Whitmore

2008

Lineup

The lineup for the 2008 festival included (although was not limited to):
 DeVotchKa
 Silversun Pickups
 Vampire Weekend
 Snowden
 Mickey Avalon
 Del the Funky Homosapien
 Cut Copy 
 The Fratellis
 Justice (French band)
 TV on the Radio
 Band of Horses
 Rock Plaza Central
 Erin Ivey
 CSS
 The Avett Brothers
 Sharon Jones & The Dap-Kings
 Dan le sac vs Scroobius Pip
 Holy F**k
 White Denim
 Superdrag
 The Night Marchers
 A Place to Bury Strangers
 The Giraffes
 SoundRabbit
 The Photo Atlas
 Blitzen Trapper
 The Kills
 Pop Levi
 Tilly and the Wall
 John Vanderslice
 Atmosphere
 Akron/Family

2009

Rain

As is the custom at Red Rocks, the show went on despite Rocky Mountain thunderstorms and showers.

Lineup

The lineup for the 2009 festival included (although was not limited to):
 The Mars Volta
 Chromeo
 Yeah Yeah Yeahs
 The Walkmen
 Phoenix
 Of Montreal
 Method Man & Redman
 OK Go
 Passion Pit
 DOOM
 Health
 Girl Talk
 M. Ward
 The Dandy Warhols
 Miniature Tigers
 Monotonix
 Frightened Rabbit
 Starfucker
 Thunderheist
 These United States
 Harlem Shakes
 Woodhands
 Thao with the Get Down Stay Down
 The Pains of Being Pure at Heart
 The Twilight Sad
 The Antlers
 Viva Voce
 The Answering Machine
 Deer Tick
 The Thermals
 Cymbals Eat Guitars
 We Were Promised Jetpacks
 Lydia
 Generationals
 The Grates
 Spindrift
 Wendy Darling
 Cotton Jones
 Jim McTunan & The Kids That Killed The Man
 FIR E!
 Beats Antique
 Gregory Alan Isakov
 Speakeasy Tiger
 Savoy and The Pirate Signal
 Danielle Ate the Sandwich
 The Knew
 The Glitch Mob
 Tigercity
 Avi Buffalo
 Edward Sharpe & The Magnetic Zeros
 Thermals and Thao
 Rachel Goodrich
 French Horn Rebellion
 Roadside Graves

References

Rock festivals in the United States
Music festivals in Colorado
Tourist attractions in Jefferson County, Colorado